Herman Tucker (September 2, 1928 – March 14, 2001) was an American truck driver and heavy equipment operator. He was allegedly linked to the murders of Chaney, Goodman, and Schwerner who were murdered by the Ku Klux Klan in June 1964. The bodies of the civil rights workers were found buried in an earthen dam on Olen Burrage's farm that Tucker had helped to construct.

Background 

Tucker was a born in and was a lifelong resident of Neshoba County, Mississippi. He was a veteran of the United States Army. At the time of the murders, Tucker lived with his wife in the Hope community found a few miles west of Philadelphia. Tucker was never identified by a witness or informant as a Klan member.

Freedom Summer Murders 

In the afternoon of June 21, 1964, Chaney, Goodman, and Schwerner arrived at Longdale to inspect the burned out church in Neshoba County. They left Longdale around 3 p.m. They were to be in Meridian by 4 p.m. that day. The fastest route to Meridian was through Philadelphia. At the fork of Beacon and Main Street their station wagon sustained a flat tire. It is possible that a shot was fired at the station wagon's tire. Rainey's home was near the Beacon and Main Street fork. Deputy Cecil Price soon arrived and escorted them to the county jail. Price released the trio as soon as the longest day of the year became night which was about 10 p.m. The three were last seen heading south along Highway 19 toward Meridian.

The disappearance of the three men was initially investigated as a missing persons case. The civil rights workers' burnt-out car was found near a swamp three days after their disappearance. An extensive search of the area was conducted by the Federal Bureau of Investigation (FBI), local and state authorities, and four hundred United States Navy sailors. The three men's bodies were not discovered until two months later, when the team received a tip. During the investigation it emerged that members of the local White Knights of the Ku Klux Klan, the Neshoba County Sheriff's Office, and the Philadelphia Police Department were involved in the incident.

Burrage's Dam 

Burrage was developing a cattle farm called the Old Jolly Farm on Highway 21 which was a few miles southwest of Philadelphia. Tucker was a part-time truck driver for Burrage and owned two Caterpillar bulldozers. Burrage contracted Tucker to clear an area on his farm for a pond and to build an earthen dam.

Sometime before the murders, Burrage remarked about the "invasion" of Civil Rights workers coming to Mississippi. Burrage allegedly proclaimed that, "Hell, I've got a dam that'll hold a hundred of them."

Arrest 

After being indicted by federal grand jury in December 1964, Tucker was placed under arrest by the Federal Bureau of Investigation for violation of Title 18, Section 241, United States Code.

Tucker was officially arrested at 9:02 a.m., December 4, 1964, and transported to the Naval Auxiliary Air Station, Meridian, Mississippi where he was taken to the Bachelor Officers Quarters on the base where he was interviewed, fingerprinted and photographed.  Tucker was ultimately acquitted in 1967.

Death 

Tucker died at his home in Neshoba County, Mississippi.

See also 
 Samuel Bowers
 Olen Lovell Burrage
 Edgar Ray Killen
 Cecil Price
 Lawrence A. Rainey
 Alton Wayne Roberts
 Jimmy Snowden
 Civil Rights Movement
United States v. Price

References 

2001 deaths
People from Philadelphia, Mississippi
Racially motivated violence against African Americans
Murder in Mississippi
1928 births
Place of birth missing
Crimes in Mississippi